Georgina García Pérez (born 13 May 1992) is a Spanish tennis player.

She has won one doubles title on the WTA Tour, one doubles title on the WTA Challenger Tour, plus 12 singles and 18 doubles titles on the ITF Women's Circuit. On 5 November 2018, she reached her best singles ranking of world No. 124. On 3 February 2020, she peaked at No. 71 in the WTA doubles rankings.

She hit the fastest women's serve on record at 220 km/h (136.7 mph) during the 2018 Hungarian Ladies Open.

She has represented Spain in Fed Cup competitions since 2018, where she has a win–loss record of 4–1.

Professional career

2014–2016
After three years without stepping on a tennis court for personal reasons, Georgina returns to the circuit.
Only a few months after her re-debut, she achieved her first professional titles. During 2015, she achieved two ITF titles, in Monzón and in Portugal.

García added another three ITF titles, plus four more titles in the doubles circuit, which led her to debut in the WTA Tour at the 2016 Copa Colsanitas, partnering Laura Pous Tió, but they lost her first-round match against Nicole Melichar and Rebecca Peterson.

2017
In 2017, she premiered on Grand Slam-level competing in qualifying draw at Wimbledon, falling in three sets to the American Sachia Vickery. A wrist injury prevented her from being active during the summer of 2017. At the end of the season, Georgina returned to the courts with the intention of adding the points needed to play the preview of the Australian Open and she was only one week away to be able to enter when winning the Pune tournament.

2018
Georgina started the season in the $60k tournament of Andrézieux, France, where she won the most important title of her career so far, defeating in the final former top 100, Arantxa Rus, by a score of 6–2, 6–0. The week after that title, García was summoned by the new captain Anabel Medina for the first time in her career to play a tie in Fed Cup. It would be against Italy on February 10 and 11, where she played the doubles match, winning against the Italian pair with María José Martínez Sánchez.

After overcoming the previous phase in the WTA Tour event in Budapest, going up two matches against Naomi Broady and the vetaranissimo, ex-top 10 Patty Schnyder, García played her first final table of a WTA-level tournament where she fell to Aleksandra Krunić in two sets. In the second match of qualifying, Georgina produced a serve of 220 km/h, which is the fastest service in the history of women's tennis, however, has yet to be verified by the WTA. In the same tournament, in the modality of doubles, García managed to win her first WTA title with her partner, the local player Fanny Stollár. They won in a tough match, with a comeback included, in the super-tiebreak at number one of the draw, the pair formed by Johanna Larsson and Kirsten Flipkens.
In May, she returned to play another final with Fanny Stollár, falling in the final of the Rabat WTA tournament against Anna Blinkova and Raluca Olaru.

After the good start of the season, Georgina received a wildcard to play for the first time in the main draw of the Madrid Open. She lost her first-round match to Donna Vekić, in two straight sets.

In June, she managed to overcome the previous phase of French Open and achieved her first victory in a Grand Slam tournament by defeating Dalila Jakupović. This victory led her to contest the second round against the favorite No. 2 and winner this year of the Australian Open, Caroline Wozniacki.

In July, García could not play the singles preview at Wimbledon for very few, but she did it in the doubles along with her Hungarian partner Fanny Stollár. They achieved the first victory in a final table of a Grand Slam doubles competition, defeating Mandy Minella and Anastasija Sevastova. However, they would lose in the second round to the eventual finalists, Nicole Melichar and Květa Peschke.

In August, she made her first appearance at the US Open; she reached the final round in the qualifying stage but could not overcome Marie Bouzková.

Grand Slam performance timelines

Only main-draw results in WTA Tour, Grand Slam tournaments, Fed Cup/Billie Jean King Cup and Olympic Games are included in win–loss records.

Singles
Current after the 2022 French Open.

Doubles

WTA career finals

Doubles: 3 (1 title, 2 runner-ups)

WTA 125 tournament finals

Doubles: 1 (1 title)

ITF Circuit finals

Singles: 19 (12 titles, 7 runner–ups)

Doubles: 31 (18 titles, 13 runner–ups)

Notes

References

External links

 
 
 

1992 births
Living people
Tennis players from Barcelona
Spanish female tennis players
Sportswomen from Catalonia